The Confessions of Dr. Dream and Other Stories is the fifth studio album by Kevin Ayers. Ayers moved to Island Records for this release which employed a vast array of session musicians. The album also marked the arrival of Patto guitarist Ollie Halsall, who would become a constant musical partner for Ayers. Other notable musicians are ex-King Crimson drummer Michael Giles, and Steve Nye and Simon Jeffes of the Penguin Cafe Orchestra. The album was critically acclaimed on release with the NME'''s Nick Kent describing it as "Ayers' most formidable recorded work to date". The album features many of Ayers' most accessible songs and arrangements.

 Track listing 
All tracks composed by Kevin Ayers

 Personnel 
Musicians

 Kevin Ayers – guitars, vocals; piano & organ (track 7a)
 Mark Warner – electric guitar (tracks 1, 3, 5, 7d), acoustic guitar (tracks 2, 7a)
 Sam Mitchell – electric guitar (tracks 1, 3-4)
 Ollie Halsall – electric guitar solo (track 3)
 Cal Batchelor – electric guitar (track 4)
 Mike Oldfield – electric guitar solo (track 4)
 John Perry – bass (tracks 1-3, 5)
 John Gustafson – bass (track 7b)
 Trevor Jones – bass (track 7c)
 Michael Giles – drums (tracks 1-3, 5, 7)
 The G'Deevy Ensemble – percussion (track 1)
 Ray Cooper – percussion (tracks 2, 7c)

 Henry Crallan – piano (track 4)
 Rupert Hine – keyboards (tracks 5-7)
 Mike Moran – piano (track 5)
 Steve Nye – organ (track 5), electric piano (track 7b)
 Mike Ratledge – organ (track 7c)
 Lol Coxhill – alto saxophone (track 5)
 Nico – vocals (track 7a)
 Doris Troy, Rosetta Hightower, Joanne Williams – backing vocals (tracks 1, 3)
 Sean Milligan – backing vocals (track 2)
 Hulloo Choir – backing vocals (tracks 5, 7d)

Technical
 Rupert Hine – producer
 John Punter – engineer
 Steve Nye – engineer
 Gerry Leitch, Sean Milligan – assistant engineer
 Simon Jeffes – additional brass arrangements
 George Smith, James Wedge – illustration

 Notes 

 References 
 Let's Drink some Wine and Have a Good Time by Kenneth Ansell (ZigZag 46, 1974)
 Album Review by Nick Kent (NME May 18, 1974)
 Business As Usual by Steve Peacock (Sounds May 25, 1974)
 Ayers and Graces'' by Nick Kent (NME Dec 7, 1974)
 Original LP sleevenotes

1974 albums
Kevin Ayers albums
Albums produced by Rupert Hine
Island Records albums